McDowell County is a county located in the U.S. state of North Carolina. As of the 2020 census, the population was 44,578. Its county seat is Marion.

McDowell County comprises the Marion, NC Micropolitan Statistical Area, which is also included in the Hickory-Lenoir, NC Combined Statistical Area.

History
Archaeological excavations performed by Dr. David Moore during the early 1980s, revealed artifacts and other evidence that the earliest inhabitants of McDowell County lived there from the Woodland period and Mississippian culture era, from 250 to 1500 AD. Dr. Moore discovered this material in an area close to the Catawba River, in and around an unusual topographical site known as Round Hill. Both the historic Cherokee and Catawba Indians were Native American peoples known to live in what is now McDowell County, and they had been there long before any Europeans. These Native Americans were living in this section for centuries before the Spanish Juan Pardo's 1566 expedition to the interior region from the Atlantic coast.

In the next two years, Pardo traveled from the Spanish colony on an island, through what are now South Carolina and Western North Carolina and into southeastern Tennessee. His expedition traveled through the area that is now McDowell County. His purpose was to acquire territory for Spain and establish forts for an alternative interior route to central Mexico. The Spanish mistakenly believed that the Appalachians connected to a range there, where they had established silver mines.

Pardo also hoped to find precious metals during his expedition, in which he stopped at several Native American villages. Pardo and his men built a log blockhouse, Fort San Juan, at a Mississippian chiefdom known as Joara at the headwaters of the Catawba River, a site north of present-day Morganton, North Carolina. They wintered over at Joara. Pardo directed his forces to establish five more forts in the interior, including one at Chiaha, in present-day southeastern Tennessee. The Native Americans raided the Spanish newcomers and killed all but one of the soldiers in the garrisons, burning all six forts in 1568. Pardo had already left for Spain by then. The Spanish gave up their efforts to settle the interior.

In 1748, "Hunting" John McDowell received a land grant from the colony of North Carolina for property known today as Pleasant Gardens, including acreage that originally extended from Swan's Pond (Catawba County) up the Catawba River west to present-day Marion and into the region known as Buck Creek. McDowell went hunting with his friend Henry Weidner, and the two came upon a lush green valley with thousands of acres of what they thought was virgin forest. They were both interested in the land, and McDowell won a wrestling match to decide who should apply for it.

McDowell settled here with his family, and received two more land grants. established residence here family, and subsequently received two land grants.  He is noted in Max Dixon's book, The Wataugans, as being instrumental in Jacob Brown's purchase of one of the last remaining pieces of acreage along the Nolichucky River in eastern Tennessee. McDowell hosted negotiations with the Cherokee from that area on his farm in North Carolina.

His son, Joseph McDowell, fought in the Battle of Kings Mountain.  McDowell County is named in his honor.  Today, McDowell's home survives, one of the few remaining that was built by its namesake.

The settlement of what was known as Old Fort took place nearby; this became for a time the westernmost outpost of colonial society. These early pioneers established a community protected by a series of forts that were used into the early 19th century. 

In 1793, Colonel John Carson built a plantation house near Buck Creek in the Pleasant Gardens community. It is known as the historic Carson House. He also operated gold mines in the southern part of the county. Colonel Carson had contributed to the Patriot cause in the American Revolutionary War.

Marion, the county seat of McDowell County, was planned and built on land selected by the first McDowell County Commissioners when they met on March 14, 1844, at the Carson House. It was not until 1845, however, that Marion was designated as the county seat by the state legislature. The settlement was named after Francis Marion, the American Revolutionary War hero known as the "Swamp Fox."

He was the subject of the dramatic movie The Patriot (2000). The historic movie The Last of the Mohicans (1992), based on a novel by James Fenimore Cooper, was set in New York state, but it was filmed along the shores of Lake James.

During the Carolina Gold Rush period of the early 19th century, the south county area was known for its gold production. The banks of the Muddy Creek and mines at Vein Mountain were productive areas. Many mines and thriving gold rush towns such as Brackettown no longer exist; scattered ruins and abandoned cemeteries mark once-active sites of the gold rush period. An old mine in Woodlawn is from this period.

McDowell County was first formed in 1842 from parts of Burke County and Rutherford County. It was named for Joseph McDowell, a Revolutionary War leader and hero of the Battle of King's Mountain. He was elected and served one term as a member of the United States House of Representatives, from 1797 to 1799.

In 1861, parts of McDowell, Burke, Caldwell, Watauga, and Yancey counties were combined to form Mitchell County. McDowell County is rich in American Civil War History.

Geography

Numerous small creeks and streams flow through the county. The Catawba River originates in and crosses the county and empties into Lake James. It flows over Catawba Falls on its way, which is accessible to the public. Other waterfalls can be found in the county, such as Toms Creek Falls. Almost half of the county, including the two aforementioned waterfalls, is located inside the Pisgah National Forest.  Linville Caverns, North Carolina's only limestone cavern system open to the public, is located in the far northern part of the county.

Geologically, McDowell County is located within the southern Appalachian Mountains region. The Blue Ridge Parkway closely follows the northwestern boundary of the county. McDowell County rises rapidly from the Piedmont (United States) in its extreme eastern border where elevations average about 1200 feet above sea level, to the Blue Ridge Mountains in the north and west. Its lowest point is 969 feet above sea level along Cane Creek in the county's southeastern corner. Its highest point is Pinnacle—at 5,665 feet above sea level the second-highest mountain (after Grandfather Mountain) in the Blue Ridge, and also considered the southernmost tip of the Black Mountains, the highest ridge in eastern America. Much of the county lies in the Foothills (North Carolina) region of Western North Carolina.

National Protected areas 
Blue Ridge Parkway (part)
Linville Gorge Wilderness (part)

State and local protected areas 
 Bobs Creek State Natural Area
 Fonta Flora State Trail (part)
 Lake James State Park (part)
 South Mountains Game Land (part)
 Wilderness Gateway State Trail (part)

Major water bodies 
 Armstrong Creek
 Bee Rock Creek
 Black Bear Cove
 Broad River
 Camp Creek
 Cane Creek
 Catawba River
 Cox Creek
 Crooked Creek
 Jake Creek
 Jarrnett Creek
 Lake James
 Lake Tahoma
 Laurel Creek
 Mill Creek
 Nix Creek
 North Fork Catawba River
 Rosas Creek
 Second Broad River
 Shoal Creek
 South Muddy Creek
 Toms Creek

Adjacent counties
 Mitchell County - north
 Avery County - north
 Burke County - east
 Rutherford County - south
 Buncombe County - west
 Yancey County - northwest

Major highways

Demographics

2020 census

As of the 2020 United States census, there were 44,578 people, 18,173 households, and 13,065 families residing in the county.

2000 census
As of the census of 2000, there were 42,151 people, 16,604 households, and 11,954 families residing in the county.  The population density was 95 people per square mile (37/km2).  There were 18,377 housing units at an average density of 42 per square mile (16/km2).  The racial makeup of the county was 92.18% White, 4.16% Black or African American, 0.29% Native American, 0.92% Asian, 0.01% Pacific Islander, 1.61% from other races, and 0.84% from two or more races.  2.88% of the population were Hispanic or Latino of any race.

There were 16,604 households, out of which 30.30% had children under the age of 18 living with them, 57.50% were married couples living together, 10.20% had a female householder with no husband present, and 28.00% were non-families. 24.30% of all households were made up of individuals, and 10.30% had someone living alone who was 65 years of age or older.  The average household size was 2.45 and the average family size was 2.90.

In the county, the population was spread out, with 22.80% under the age of 18, 8.20% from 18 to 24, 29.90% from 25 to 44, 24.90% from 45 to 64, and 14.30% who were 65 years of age or older.  The median age was 38 years. For every 100 females there were 99.30 males.  For every 100 females age 18 and over, there were 97.70 males.

The median income for a household in the county was $32,396, and the median income for a family was $37,789. Males had a median income of $26,609 versus $21,640 for females. The per capita income for the county was $16,109.  About 9.00% of families and 11.60% of the population were below the poverty line, including 15.10% of those under age 18 and 15.70% of those age 65 or over.

Government and politics
McDowell County is a member of the Isothermal Planning and Development Commission regional council of governments.

McDowell County voted Republican in the three elections from 1900 to 1908, but otherwise was solidly Democratic until 1956, when Dwight D. Eisenhower carried the county. Since then, like other areas of the North Carolina Foothills, it has become predominantly Republican. Since 1956, only two Democratic candidates have won the county's vote in presidential elections: Lyndon Johnson in 1964 and Jimmy Carter in 1976, both hailing from the southern region of the nation.

2016 presidential primaries and election
In the 2016 Republican Primary in McDowell County, Donald Trump received 2,552 votes (or 41.2% of the total votes) followed by Ted Cruz, who came in second with 2,422 votes (or 39.1% of the total votes).  In the 2016 Democratic Primary, Bernie Sanders received 1,622 votes (49.0%) and Hillary Clinton received 1,353 votes (40.9%).

In the 2016 presidential election in McDowell County, Republican Donald Trump received 14,517 votes (74.2%), Democrat Hillary Clinton 4,645 votes (23.8%), and Libertarian Gary Johnson 395 votes (2.0%).

Education

The following is a list of schools located in McDowell County:
 Marion Elementary School
 West Marion Elementary School
 Nebo Elementary School
 Old Fort Elementary School
 Pleasant Gardens Elementary School
 Eastfield Global Magnet School
 Glenwood Elementary School
 North Cove Elementary School
 West McDowell Middle School
 East McDowell Middle School
 Foothills Community School
 McDowell High School
 McDowell Early College High School 
 McDowell Academy for Innovation 
 Phoenix Academy
 New Manna Christian School
 Nebo Crossing Christian Academy

McDowell County has one community college: McDowell Technical Community College

Communities

City
 Marion (county seat and largest city)

Town
 Old Fort

Census-designated place
 West Marion

Unincorporated communities
 Glenwood
 Linville Falls
 Little Switzerland
 Nebo
 North Cove

Townships

 Crooked Creek
 Dysartsville
 Glenwood
 Marion
 Montford Cove
 Nebo
 North Cove
 Old Fort
 Pleasant Gardens
 Sugar Hill
 Woodlawn-Sevier

See also
 List of counties in North Carolina
 National Register of Historic Places listings in McDowell County, North Carolina
 North Carolina State Parks
 National Park Service
 List of national forests of the United States

References

External links

 
 
 McDowell Tourism
 Discover McDowell County
 NCGenWeb McDowell County - free genealogy resources for the county

 
1842 establishments in North Carolina
Populated places established in 1842
Counties of Appalachia